William Willy (1703?–22 May 1765) was an English politician.

He was born the second son of George Willy, a mercer of New Park, Devizes, Wiltshire, with whom he started his career. 

He was a Member (MP) of the Parliament of England for Devizes from 1747 to his death in 1765.

He died unmarried.

References

1703 births
1765 deaths
Directors of the British East India Company
People from Devizes
Members of the Parliament of Great Britain for English constituencies
British MPs 1747–1754
British MPs 1754–1761
British MPs 1761–1768